Joseph Matthew Ashworth (6 January 1943 – 2002) was an English footballer who played as a wing half.

Career
Ashworth was born in Huddersfield, West Yorkshire and progressed through the junior ranks at Bradford Park Avenue, before signing as a professional in January 1960. After making three Football League appearances in two and a half years at Park Avenue, he joined Fourth Division team York City in May 1962. His debut came in a 0–0 draw with Rochdale in the FA Cup first round on 3 November 1962. The opportunity of his league debut came after an injury to Alan Woods, nearly a year after signing, and he played in a 5–2 victory over Oldham Athletic on 20 April 1963. He finished the 1962–63 season with nine appearances. He was released by York in the summer of 1965 after making 65 appearances for the team.

He signed for Bournemouth in June, where he played for two seasons, making 60 league appearances and scoring two goals before joining Southend United in July 1967. Ashworth made 36 league appearances and scored two goals during the 1967–68 season for Southend before joining Rochdale in July 1968. He made 132 league appearances and scored three goals for Rochdale, before moving on to Chester in December 1971. He made five appearances for Chester in the remainder of the 1971–72 season and joined Stockport County in June 1962. He made 14 league appearances at Stockport before retiring. Following his retirement, he joined Her Majesty's Prison Service and died in 2002.

Style of play
He was a good passer of the ball and during his career was regarded as one of the best passers in the lower leagues.

References

1943 births
2002 deaths
Footballers from Huddersfield
English footballers
Association football midfielders
Bradford (Park Avenue) A.F.C. players
York City F.C. players
AFC Bournemouth players
Southend United F.C. players
Rochdale A.F.C. players
Chester City F.C. players
Stockport County F.C. players
English Football League players